The Berkhof Ambassador is a low-floor city bus produced by the Dutch bus manufacturer VDL Berkhof between 2001 and 2011 when it was replaced by the VDL Citea. The section between the front and rear door are at the same height. The seats at the very rear are a bit higher, and can be reached by using stairs.

This type of bus is most commonly used in the Netherlands and Denmark. In the Netherlands, owners and operators include:Arriva, Breng, Connexxion, Hermes, Syntus and Veolia Transport. In Denmark, owners and operators include: Arriva, City-Trafik, De Hvide Busser, DitoBus, Kruse, Nettbuss and Nobina. In Italy, owners and operators include CA.NOVA.

History
The Ambassador has been in production since 2001, and its exterior is largely unchanged; the interior, however, has undergone several changes, and the vehicle is assembled at low cost. The older series (built from 2001 to 2005) has an inferior suspension, which causes the bus to rattle. The Ambassador was originally equipped with a Voith automatic gearbox, which was noisy. Later versions are sturdier, and more-recent Voith gearboxes are quieter in use. The combination of better isolation and a more environmentally-conscious Cummins engine makes the bus quieter. The suspension has also been improved, allowing for a smoother ride.

The first series (Connexxion/Hermes) of Ambassadors was delivered with green LCD route signals (line number and destination). These occasionally malfunctioned, and later series were delivered with orange LED route signals. This type of bus has been involved in several incidents: in December 2003 a driver was killed after becoming stuck between the front door and the bus (this type of door has since been replaced), and during a storm on 18 January 2007 an Ambassador was blown off a dike due to its light weight.

Orders
Connexxion has ordered the most Ambassador buses by far; in 2005 it placed an order of 300 buses for €50 million. Since the capacity of VDL's factory in Heerenveen was inadequate for an order of this size, the factory in Valkenswaard was equipped to build Ambassador buses as well. Following its success in the Netherlands, the Ambassador was also exported; orders were placed by operators in Denmark, Germany and Israel. In July 2008, Connexxion placed a 355-bus order for the Ambassador,  to be delivered throughout the year. The total cost of the order was €75 million.

Types

Ambassador 120

Using knowledge and experience gained from the ALE120, VDL designed a 10-meter midibus which is designated Ambassador Low Entry 106 (ALE 106) (bus length 106 dm, or 10.6 m). These buses are primarily used in several cities in the Netherlands. The bus is built on a DAF/VDL SB120 chassis, which was also used for the Wright Cadet. In 2008, the DAF/VDL SB120 chassis was exchanged for a VDL SB180.

Ambassador 200

The Ambassador 200 is a 12-meter-long lightweight bus made for local and long-distance transportation. Hundreds of buses from this type have been produced. It is designated as Ambassador Low Entry 120 (ALE 120) (the bus length is 120 dm, or 12 m). Its coachwork rests on a DAF/VDL SB200 chassis, which is also used for the Wright Commander from Wrightbus. The weight of the older buses differs from later models because of different materials and a different engine. Its interior varies by company. The passenger seats are made inexpensively; they are plastic cups with a layer of foam on the seat and fabric on top. Several buses have been equipped with more-luxurious seats.

Overview
The following table shows the Ambassador 200 buses in service in the Netherlands and other countries:

A large number of buses have been exported to Denmark, Germany, Egged in Israel, Portugal and Sweden.

Gallery

See also

 List of buses

References

External links
VDL Berkhof
  Pictures

VDL Groep
Low-entry buses
Low-floor buses
Vehicles introduced in 2001